Babak Hamidian (born 1981) is an Iranian actor. He has received various accolades, including a Crystal Simorgh, a Hafez Award, an Iran Cinema Celebration Award and two Iran's Film Critics and Writers Association Awards.

Filmography

Film

Web

Television

References

External links

Iranian male actors
Living people
1981 births
Crystal Simorgh for Best Supporting Actor winners